The Emmett Till Antilynching Act is a landmark United States federal law which makes lynching a federal hate crime.

The act amends the Matthew Shepard and James Byrd Jr. Hate Crimes Prevention Act and prior hate crime laws to define lynching as any conspired bias-motivated offense which results in death or serious bodily injury. It was passed by the U.S. House of Representatives on February 28, 2022, and U.S. Senate on March 7, 2022, and signed into law on March 29, 2022, by President Joe Biden.

Background 
The bill was named after 14-year-old Emmett Till, who was lynched in Mississippi in 1955, sparking national and international outrage after photos of his mutilated corpse were published in Black-oriented print media.

A federal antilynching bill had been in discussion for over a century and had been proposed hundreds of times. Past attempts which passed at least one legislative chamber include the Dyer Anti-Lynching Bill, the Costigan-Wagner Bill and the Justice for Victims of Lynching Act.

116th Congress 
Representative Bobby Rush introduced a bill, on January 3, 2019, during the 116th United States Congress.

The bill was reported out of the House Judiciary Committee on October 31, 2019, and was passed by the House, 410–4, on February 26, 2020.

During June 2020, while protests and civil unrest over the murder of George Floyd were occurring nationwide, the bill was considered by the Senate. Senator Rand Paul prevented the bill from being passed by unanimous consent as he opposed the bill's language for being overly broad. Paul felt the legislation would include attacks which he felt were not extreme enough to qualify as "lynching", stating that "this bill would cheapen the meaning of lynching by defining it so broadly as to include a minor bruise or abrasion." Paul proposed an amendment that would apply a "serious bodily injury standard" for a crime to be considered as lynching.

House Majority Leader Steny Hoyer criticized Rand Paul's position, saying on Twitter that "it is shameful that one GOP Senator is standing in the way of seeing this bill become law." Then-senator Kamala Harris added that "Senator Paul is now trying to weaken a bill that was already passed — there's no reason for this" while speaking to have the amendment defeated.

117th Congress 

The vote was 422–3, with Republicans Andrew Clyde, Thomas Massie, and Chip Roy voting against. The bill was introduced to the Senate by Senator Cory Booker and cosponsored by Senators Paul, Tim Scott, and Raphael Warnock, among others. They passed the bill through unanimous consent on March 7, 2022. Senate Majority Leader Chuck Schumer remarked on the Senate floor after the bill’s passage that: "After more than 200 failed attempts to outlaw lynching, Congress is finally succeeding in taking the long overdue action by passing the Emmett Till Antilynching Act. Hallelujah. It’s long overdue.” The bill was signed into law by President Joe Biden on March 29, 2022.

Text 
The act amends section 249(a) of Title 18 of the United States Code to include:

Legislative history

See also
 Dyer Anti-Lynching Bill, 1918
 Justice for Victims of Lynching Act, 2018
 Lynching in the United States

References

External links
 Emmett Till Antilynching Act (PDF/details) as amended in the GPO Statute Compilations collection
 Emmett Till Antilynching Act (PDF/details) as enacted in the US Statutes at Large

Acts of the 117th United States Congress
Anti-lynching movement
Anti-racism in the United States
Articles containing video clips
Emmett Till
Lynching in the United States
Hate crime
Proposed legislation of the 116th United States Congress